Herman Ferdinandus Maria Münninghoff, (30 November 1921 – 7 February 2018) was a Dutch prelate of the Roman Catholic Church. He was the oldest Dutch Roman Catholic bishop.

Münninghoff was born in Woerden, Netherlands and was ordained a priest on 15 March 1953 from the Order of Friars Minor. Münninghoff was appointed bishop of the Diocese of Djajapura on 6 May 1972 and was ordained bishop on 10 September 1972 to the newly renamed Diocese of Jayapura. Münninghoff served until his retirement on 29 August 1997.

References

External links
Catholic-Hierarchy

1921 births
2018 deaths
20th-century Roman Catholic bishops in Indonesia
People from Woerden
20th-century Dutch Roman Catholic priests
Franciscan bishops
Dutch Friars Minor